Admiral Prince Victor Ferdinand Franz Eugen Gustaf Adolf Constantin Friedrich of Hohenlohe-Langenburg,  (11 December 1833 – 31 December 1891), also known as Count von Gleichen, was an officer in the Royal Navy, and a sculptor.

Biography
He was born at Langenburg in Württemberg, the third son of Ernst I, Prince of Hohenlohe-Langenburg (1794–1860) and Princess Feodora of Leiningen (1807–1872).  His mother was Queen Victoria's half-sister, and his family was therefore closely related to the British Royal Family.

Victor (sometimes spelled Viktor) became an officer in the British Royal Navy in 1848 and was promoted to Lieutenant in 1854.  As a Lieutenant at time of the Crimean War, he served on the first-rate HMS St Jean d'Acre in the Mediterranean under Captain Henry Keppel in 1855; commanded the gunboat HMS Traveller for a few months in 1856 after her launch until she was paid off; served again under Keppel again on the fourth-rate HMS Raleigh in the East Indies and China, until she was wrecked near Macau in 1857.  He was recommended for the Victoria Cross for his service in China in 1856.  He was promoted to Commander in 1857, and commanded the first-rate sloop HMS Scourge in the Mediterranean.  Promoted to Captain in 1859, he took command of the 21-gun corvette HMS Racoon from commissioning in 1863 until 1866, during which time Queen Victoria's second son, Alfred, Duke of Edinburgh (1844–1900) served on board as a lieutenant.

He retired from active service in 1866, and was appointed Knight Commander of the Order of the Bath (KCB) that year (advanced to GCB in 1887). In retirement, he was promoted to the rank of Retired Rear admiral in December 1876, and advanced to Retired Vice admiral on 23 November 1881 and to Retired Admiral on 24 May 1887.

Prince Victor resumed use of his native title, "HSH Prince Victor of Hohenlohe-Langenburg" in December 1885, when Queen Victoria authorised his wife to share his princely style at the Court of St. James's instead of bearing her lower, morganatic title. He died in London, before his children were obliged by King George V in 1917 to exchange their German comital titles for British courtesy titles during World War I. He was buried at Sunningdale.

Works

He became a sculptor after retiring from the Navy.

Examples of his work include
 the huge statue of King Alfred in the market square of Wantage, Oxfordshire.
 the Black Angel corbels and shields on the roof of the Banqueting Hall of The Convent, Gibraltar carved in 1863 with monograms of the Kings and Queens of Great Britain and Spain who were in possession of Gibraltar.
 the bust of Mary Seacole made in 1871, in the Institute of Jamaica in Kingston, Jamaica.
 the statue of Queen Victoria in the North quadrangle of Royal Holloway College, University of London, Egham, Surrey.
 the bust of Queen Victoria on the Jubilee Memorial, Gateacre, Liverpool
 the statue of Thomas Holloway with his wife Jane, in the South quadrangle of Royal Holloway College, University of London, Egham, Surrey.
 the statue of Frederick Gye at the Royal Opera House, Covent Garden, London, 1880.
 the bust of Admiral of the Fleet Sir Henry Keppel (with whom the artist served) in the Wellington Room at the Institute of Directors, 116 Pall Mall, London.
 the bust of Commodore James Graham Goodenough at the National Maritime Museum, Greenwich.

Family
He married Laura Williamina Seymour, the younger daughter of Admiral Sir George Francis Seymour (under whom he served on HMS Cumberland in the 1850s) on 24 January 1861 in London. Shortly before his morganatic marriage, his wife was created Countess von Gleichen, after Gleichen which was at one stage owned by a branch of the Hohenlohe family.  They had four children:

Countess Feodora (Feo) Georgina Maud Gleichen (20 December 1861 – 22 February 1922)
Count Albert Edward Wilfred Gleichen (15 January 1863 – 13 December 1937) he married The Honorable Sylvia Edwardes on 2 July 1910, 
Countess Victoria (Valda) Alice Leopoldina Ada Laura Gleichen (28 November 1868 – 10 September 1951) she married Lt.-Col. Percy Machell on 5 December 1905. They had one son:
Roger Victor Machell (23 July 1908 – 18 January 1984)
Countess Helena Emily Gleichen (1 February 1873 – 28 January 1947)

Prince Victor's only son Edward, also known as Count Gleichen, became a Major General in the British Army.

Ancestry

References

External links

Details of naval career
Details of precedence
Peerage.com
NPG
Letter to Edward VII
Statue of Queen Victoria at Royal Holloway College
Statue of Thomas and Jane Holloway at Royal Holloway College

1833 births
1891 deaths
Knights Grand Cross of the Order of the Bath
People from Sunningdale
Royal Navy officers
Royal Navy personnel of the Second Opium War
House of Hohenlohe-Langenburg
Princes of Hohenlohe-Langenburg
People from Langenburg
19th-century British sculptors
British male sculptors
19th-century German sculptors
German male sculptors
19th-century British male artists